Crash Test Danny was a series of 13 educational science sketch television shows for the Discovery Kids channel in the UK.

Danny, played by Ben Langley, is a crash test dummy who goes the extra mile to put the fizz into physics. He is both motivated and hindered by the Professor, played by Gary Carpenter (who also co-wrote the program).

The shows were directed by Justin Rhodes, narrated by Jon Holmes, and series produced by Mark Robson at Initial Television.

References

Science education television series
Physics education in the United Kingdom